100 Reasons to Live is the third studio album produced by EDM artist Gareth Emery, released on 1 April 2016 through Garuda Records & Armada Music. The album is the follow-up to Gareth's second studio album Drive, released in 2014. The album includes the singles "Reckless", "Hands", "Far From Home", and "CVNT5".

Track listing

Music videos
 "Reckless" 
 "Hands" 
 "CVNT5"
 "Far From Home (Craig Connelly Remix)"
 "Lost"
 "Save Me"

Charts

Release history

References

Gareth Emery albums
2016 albums
Armada Music albums
Trance albums